The GAF Turana was a target drone produced by the Australian Government Aircraft Factories (GAF). The name is believed to be from an Aboriginal Australian word meaning rainbow.

The Turana target drone was designed and built in Australia as a development of the Ikara anti-submarine weapon system. It was a target drone with remote control that was launched from the Ikara launcher for use in naval anti-aircraft target practice.

Design and development
The Turana had a composite metal/fibre glass structure and was powered by a Microturbo Cougar 022 Turbojet.

The Turana was first flown from Woomera in August 1971. The program was cancelled in 1979 as water ingress during recovery of the drone was causing failure of the electronics.

See also
List of unmanned aerial vehicles

Notes

References

Further reading

External links
Turana target drone Historical Aircraft Restoration Society (HARS)

GAF aircraft
Target drones
Unmanned aerial vehicles of Australia
Aircraft first flown in 1971
Single-engined jet aircraft
Mid-wing aircraft